Highway 339 is a highway in the Canadian province of Saskatchewan.

Highway 339 passes near Claybank, Avonlea Badlands, the Dirt Hills, and Briercrest. Highway 339 connects with Highways 715 and 716.

See also
Roads in Saskatchewan

References

339